The Coolera Peninsula is a peninsula in Sligo Bay, County Sligo, Ireland. It is the most populous of County Sligo's peninsulas, and the second-largest by land area. The primary population centres on Coolera are the coastal town of Strandhill on its western shore, and Magheraboy, a suburb of Sligo town.

The peninsula is characterised by a vast network of Megalithic and Neolithic tombs, cairns and ringforts spread out across its landscape. The Carrowmore Megalithic Complex dates back to the 4th millennium BC, and is one of the largest megalithic complexes in Ireland. The 30,000-tonne tomb of Queen Médb, known as Miosgán Médhbh, sits atop Knocknarea mountain and is clearly visible from much of northern Sligo, making it one of the county's most recognisable landmarks. Taken together, Sligo County Council has applied for this network of ancient monuments to be recognised as a UNESCO World Heritage Site.

In contrast to its ancient history, the peninsula's main settlement, Strandhill, was only established in the 20th century. Prior to this, locals settled inland due to the persistence of windblown sand along the coastal areas. In 1895 Belfast-native Benjamin Murrow bought up land on the west coast of Coolera. In an attempt to attract visitors to the area, he constructed a road from the inland village to the sea, and had built a bathhouse and a hotel by 1913. This road, which ran uphill from the beach strand to the village, gave the town its name, Strandhill. Today, the town is one of Sligo's top tourist destinations, and contains many hotels, bars, surf schools and a golf course. Construction of the National Surf Centre of Excellence started in the town in 2019.

The 20th century saw the westward growth of Sligo town, and the suburban area of Magheraboy is also located on the Coolera Peninsula. The R292 road loops around the coastline of the peninsula, and connects Strandhill to Sligo town and Ballysadare.

Places of interest

Ballysadare Bay Natural Heritage Area
Carrowmore Megalithic Complex
Cloverhill Megalthic Chamber
Coney Island
Cullenamore Beach
Killaspugbrone Ruins
Knocknarea
Lisheen House
Maguins Island
Marian Shrine
Miosgán Médhbh
The Nun's Beach
Rathcarrick Wood
Rinn Ringforts
Seafield House
Seaweed Baths
Sligo Airport
Strandhill Beach
Strandhill Golf Club
Strandhill People's Market

Gallery

See also
 Carbury, County Sligo
 Coastal landforms of Ireland

References

Geography of County Sligo
Landforms of County Sligo
History of County Sligo
Beaches of County Sligo
Surfing locations in Ireland
Peninsulas of the Republic of Ireland